= Esquiú =

Coordinates: 29°23′S 65°17′W

- Municipality and village
- Interactive map of Esquiú
- Country: Argentina
- Province: Catamarca Province
- Time zone: UTC−3 (ART)

Esquiú is a village and municipality in Catamarca Province in northwestern Argentina.
